The Raizal are an Afro-Caribbean ethnic group from the Archipelago of San Andrés, Providencia and Santa Catalina, off of Colombia's Caribbean coast. They are recognized by the Colombian authorities as one of the Afro-Colombian ethnic groups under the multicultural policy pursued since 1991. They are speakers of the San Andrés-Providencia Creole, one of many English Creoles used in the Caribbean.

Demographics
In 2005, the Raizal were 57% of the 60,000 inhabitants of the San Andrés y Providencia Department, according to official statistics, but other sources claim they are now a minority population in the archipelago because of migration from and to mainland Colombia. Raizals are of pure African descent or mulattoes of African and British descent. The Raizal community in the mainland is represented by the Organización de la comunidad raizal con residencia fuera del archipiélago de San Andrés, Providencia y Santa Catalina (Orfa, based in Bogotá).

Self-determination 

In 1903, the local Raizal population of the Providencia and Santa Catalina Islands rejected an offer from the United States to separate from Colombia and to imitate Panama.

Towards the late 1960s, separatist movements became active in the archipelago. The first separatists, an underground movement, were led by Marcos Archbold Britton, who addressed a memorandum to the United Nations asking for the inclusion of the archipelago in the list of colonized territories. The UN High Commissioner for Refugees (UNHCR) paid a private visit to the archipelago shortly afterwards, arousing suspicion in mainland Colombia.

The second movement, which started in the late 1970s, grew stronger in the following decade, and culminated in the creation in March 1984 of the Sons of the Soil Movement (S.O.S.), openly claiming the right to self-determination.

Since 1999, another organization, the Archipelago Movement for Ethnic Native Self-Determination for the Archipelago of San Andrés, Providence and Santa Catalina (AMEN-SD), a radical separatist movement led by Rev. Raymond Howard Britton, has demanded the creation of an independent state.

There are now, according to a document from the Colombian government, two trends among the Raizals: a radical one, the Pueblo Indígena Raizal, represented by the Indigenous Native Organizations, among whom Amen, Barraca New Face, Infaunas (a Rastafarian-inspired group of farmers and fishermen), Ketna (Ketlënan National Association) and the SOS Foundation, and a more moderate one, Comunidad Raizal (Native Foundation and Integración Básica) led by former governors who are friends of the Colombian establishment, mainly Felix Palacios, Carlos Archbold and Alvaro Archbold N. The latter group is understandably more ready to participate in bipartite institutions set up by the Colombian authorities.

On April 28, 2002, the Raizal people signed a declaration of self-determination and asked the Colombian government and the International Court of Justice for a major recognition of their autonomy and for appropriate resources to improve the quality of life in the island.

See also
Cocolos

References

Further reading 

Afro-Caribbean
Afro-Colombian
Ethnic groups in Central America
Ethnic groups in Colombia
Ethnic groups in the Caribbean
Multiracial affairs in the Americas